David Wightman may refer to:

David Wightman (painter) (born 1980), English painter
David Wightman (priest) (born 1939), Anglican priest
Ross Wightman (David Ross Wightman, 1929–2012), New Zealand rugby union player
David Wightman, see Scottish Broadcasting Commission

See also
David Whiteman (disambiguation)